Laura Packard (born May 23, 1976) is an American health care activist and political commentator. She is the founder of Health Care Voices, a non-profit grassroots organization for adults with serious medical conditions. She is executive director of the group Health Care Voter, with actress Alyssa Milano, singer T-Boz, politicians Donna Edwards and Anton Gunn, activists Ady Barkan and Brad Woodhouse, and others as co-chairs. Packard is also executive director of Get America Covered, a group that promotes increased health coverage. She hosts a weekly call-in television show for Americans with health care and health insurance questions on act.tv, Care Talk.

Packard was a featured speaker at the 2020 Democratic National Convention with Joe Biden.

A self-employed small business owner, she was diagnosed with Stage 4 Hodgkin Lymphoma in 2017. Believing that the Affordable Care Act saved her life and that without it she would be bankrupt or dead without the care she received through her insurance, she became an outspoken critic of repeal attempts. Her sharp questioning led United States Senator Dean Heller to eject her from a public event, and her criticism of President Donald Trump resulted in him blocking her on Twitter. A 2018 lawsuit, Knight First Amendment Institute v. Trump, forced President Donald Trump to reinstate her access to his social media accounts, along with that of 40 others.

Packard spoke on four national bus tours with progressive health care advocacy organization Protect Our Care in 2018, 2019, 2021 and 2022.

Moving to Denver, Colorado in 2019, her political advocacy broadened to include challenges to United States Senator Cory Gardner’s community engagement, and she went on a statewide bus tour with “Cardboard Cory” to accentuate his purported inaccessibility. She also challenged United States Representative Lauren Boebert's health care record. and was  blocked by Boebert on Twitter in February 2022.

In 2018, Packard was noted for her outspoken opposition to the nomination of Justice Brett Kavanaugh. She was included again in media coverage for her 2020 opposition to the nomination of Justice Amy Coney Barrett.

She has appeared as an advocate on health issues on ABC, CBS, NBC, Fox, MSNBC, in the New York Times, Washington Post, USA Today, and on Colorado Public Radio, among other media.

References

Living people
People from Colorado
American political activists
1976 births
University of Michigan alumni